The Chase Line is a suburban railway line in the West Midlands region of England. It runs from its southern terminus, Birmingham New Street, to Walsall, and then Rugeley in Staffordshire, where it joins the Trent Valley Line. The name of the line refers to Cannock Chase which it runs through at its northern end.

Part of the line, between Birmingham and Walsall, has been electrified since the 1960s; work to electrify the remaining 15 mile stretch of line between Walsall and Rugeley, was completed in December 2018.

History
The line from Birmingham via Aston, Perry Barr and Bescot was opened in 1837 as part of one of the earliest railway main lines; the Grand Junction Railway (GJR). This line did not serve Walsall directly, but continued from Bescot to Wolverhampton (this is now part of the Walsall to Wolverhampton Line). A station on the GJR called Walsall was opened on the outskirts of the town, this was later renamed , and is now closed. The GJR became part of the London and North Western Railway (LNWR) in 1846.
The section between Walsall and Rugeley Trent Valley was constructed by the South Staffordshire Railway, and the Cannock Mineral Railway (CMR): The South Staffordshire Railway built the line from Walsall to Cannock, opening in 1858, and the CMR built the line from Cannock to Rugeley, opening in 1859. The South Staffordshire Railway was absorbed by the LNWR in 1867, as was the CMR two years later.
The last part of what is now the Walsall/Chase Line, the Soho Loop Line; a link running from Perry Barr Junction on the original GJR to Soho Junction on the Stour Valley Line, allowing an alternative route into Birmingham from the west which bypassed Aston, was opened by the LNWR in 1889.

Walsall – Rugeley: closure and reopening
Passenger services on the line between Walsall and Rugeley Trent Valley were withdrawn in 1965, and the intermediate stations closed as part of the Beeching Axe, the line however remained open to freight, although until the 1980s it was not unknown for diverted Inter-City passenger services from Birmingham to Manchester, Edinburgh, Glasgow, etc. to use the line in the event of the Wolverhampton-Stafford route being shut for Sunday or late evening engineering work.

Passenger services were restored to the line and most of the stations reopened between 1989 and 1998, as part of a joint initiative between the West Midlands Passenger Transport Executive (WMPTE) and Staffordshire County Council. The name Chase Line was invented as a marketing name for the restored line, and came into use at this time. The restoration took place in stages, as follows:

10 April 1989 — Walsall to Hednesford
2 June 1997 — Hednesford to Rugeley Town
25 May 1998 — Rugeley Town to Rugeley Trent Valley and Stafford
12 December 2008 — Chase Line trains are cut back from Stafford to Rugeley Trent Valley.
22 May 2018 — Chase Line trains increased to a 30-minute frequency Monday to Saturday, with a 60-minute frequency on Sunday
19 May 2019 — Electric passenger services begin north of Walsall. In addition to this, services are extended to Birmingham International (2tph).

Route
The line from Birmingham to Walsall (sometimes referred to as the Walsall Line) has two alternative routes, both electrified at 25 kV AC overhead. One leaves New Street to the east, following the Cross-City Line as far as Aston, where it diverges to the west. The other leaves to the west, and travels via Soho. Beyond Walsall, the line was electrified in 2019, and continues north to Hednesford and Rugeley. This section was freight-only for some years, reopening to passenger trains in stages between 1989 and 1998.

Places served on the route are listed below. For information on the stations, please refer to the list in the route map.

Chase Line (Walsall – Rugeley)
Stafford – Stafford railway station – Interchange services to Stoke-On-Trent, London, Crewe and many others (1998 – Late 2008) 
Rugeley – Rugeley Town & Rugeley Trent Valley – Interchange services to London Euston and Crewe railway station.
Brindley Heath (closed in 1959)
Hednesford
Cannock
Great Wyrley (closed in 1965)
Landywood
Bloxwich North
Bloxwich
Walsall

Walsall Line (Birmingham – Walsall)
Walsall
Bescot (for Bescot Stadium, the home of Walsall FC) Wednesbury, Boundary Mill & IKEA
Stone Cross (near Tame Bridge Parkway station)
Hamstead
Perry Barr
Witton
Aston – For Aston Villa
Duddeston
Birmingham New Street (Interchange For Grand Central, Bullring, ICC, Symphony Hall & The Mailbox)
Services then continue onwards to  via the Rugby–Birmingham–Stafford Line.

Passenger trains are operated by West Midlands Trains on behalf of Transport for West Midlands.

Services
 
Monday to Saturday daytime there are four trains per hour from Birmingham New Street to Walsall. Two per hour run via  and call at all stations, the other two per hour run direct via Soho and call at Tame Bridge Parkway and Walsall. Two of these per-hour continue to Rugeley Trent Valley during the day, dropping to one in the late evenings.  

There is also a 6am service from Wolverhampton to Rugeley Trent Valley but this is only one way. It runs the entire Birmingham to Walsall section calling at all stations them onto the Chase Line.

As of May 2019, following the electrification of the line north of Walsall, West Midlands Trains began operating 2tph (Mon–Sat) from Rugeley Trent Valley to Birmingham International with 1tph continuing to Northampton or London Euston. On Sundays, all services from Rugeley terminate at Coventry. All services are formed by Class 350 EMUs.

Electrification
The lines between New Street and Walsall were electrified in 1966 as an offshoot of the West Coast Main Line electrification, along with the Walsall to Wolverhampton Line.

In July 2012, the coalition government announced the overhead electrification of the Chase Line between Rugeley Trent Valley and Walsall, with work scheduled to take place from 2014. It was estimated to cost around £36 million, as part of a £9.4 billion package of investment in the railways in England and Wales, including £4.2 billion of new schemes, unveiled by the government. Preliminary work to re-signal the route ahead of electrification was completed in August 2013, with the closure of the three remaining manual signal boxes at Bloxwich, Hednesford & Brereton Sidings and the panel boxes at Walsall & Bescot.  Control of the area passed to the West Midlands SCC at Saltley.

The work originally had an estimated completion date of December 2017, but previously unknown mine shafts underneath the track meant that many bases for the overhead infrastructure had to be redesigned. Network Rail closed the line in August 2017 for two weeks. The electrification was finally completed in December 2018, the first electric train services started in May 2019.

Effects of electrification of the line
Bloxwich level crossing closed to motorised traffic in January 2018, and the bridge at Central Drive, north of the crossing, had been strengthened and widened to improve the alternative route. It also enabled the line to transport W10 freight containers.

For residents of the stations north of Walsall, the changes meant shorter journey times and longer trains, which reduced overcrowding to Birmingham with 2 trains per hour (tph) for the whole day, continuing direct to Birmingham International (1tph). The electrification itself created over 1,300 jobs in the area and generated a further £113 million of gross value added (GVA) benefit per annum, as well as reducing the operating costs of the line. In May 2014, London Midland announced that it was intending to run longer trains on the route, requiring station platforms to be extended to accommodate.

Gavin Williamson, Conservative MP for South Staffordshire, campaigned to limit the speed of trains through Great Wyrley and Cheslyn Hay when the upgrade work of the line was to be completed. He wrote to then Transport Secretary Patrick McLoughlin, to request confirmation that trains travelling through the areas would not exceed a speed of 45 mph. He also requested that "environmental mitigation measures" be put in place to reduce the potential impact of the electrification on residents in South Staffordshire. Network Rail had previously said that electric trains are quieter, greener and cleaner, reducing carbon emissions.

Gallery

References

A Century of Railways Around Birmingham and the West Midlands, Volume 3 1973–1999, John Boynton.
Quail Railway Track Diagrams, Volume 4: Midlands & North West

External links

The Chase Line.
Notice of motion to electrify the Chase line.

History of the West Midlands (county)
Rail transport in Birmingham, West Midlands
Rail transport in Staffordshire
Rail transport in Walsall
Railway lines in the West Midlands (region)